Tetrahedron Peak is a mountain in British Columbia, Canada. The highest peak on the Sunshine Coast, it rises to an elevation of 1739 metres (5705 ft), with a prominence of 1164 metres (3819 ft). It is located in the Tetrahedron Provincial Park.

References

External links 
 

One-thousanders of British Columbia
Sunshine Coast Regional District
Coast Mountains
New Westminster Land District